Réda Rabeï (born 12 July 1994) is a French professional footballer who plays as a midfielder for Russian club Fakel Voronezh on loan from Botev Plovdiv in the Bulgarian First League. He was a professional futsal player and France Futsal international, where he played as a goalkeeper, before switching to football.

Club career
In the 2014–2015 season, Rabeï scored 34 goals and was top scorer for Douai Gayant in the Championnat de France de Futsal. Rabeï switched to football, and transferred to Wasquehal in 2016 wherein he scored 8 goals in 10 games. He then transferred to Ligue 2 with Amiens for the 2016–17 season.

On 24 June 2019, Rabeï joined Danish 1st Division club Fremad Amager.

On 3 February 2023, Rabeï moved on loan to Fakel Voronezh in the Russian Premier League.

International career
Rabeï represented the France Futsal.

Personal life
Rabeï was born in France, and is of Algerian descent.

References

External links

1994 births
Sportspeople from Roubaix
Footballers from Hauts-de-France
French sportspeople of Algerian descent
Living people
French footballers
French men's futsal players
Futsal goalkeepers
Association football midfielders
Wasquehal Football players
Amiens SC players
Lyon La Duchère players
Liga I players
ASC Daco-Getica București players
US Avranches players
Fremad Amager players
Botev Plovdiv players
FC Fakel Voronezh players
Championnat National players
Ligue 2 players
Danish 1st Division players
First Professional Football League (Bulgaria) players
Russian Premier League players
French expatriate footballers
Expatriate footballers in Romania
French expatriate sportspeople in Romania
Expatriate men's footballers in Denmark
French expatriate sportspeople in Denmark
Expatriate footballers in Bulgaria
French expatriate sportspeople in Bulgaria
Expatriate footballers in Russia
French expatriate sportspeople in Russia